Vittorio Ghirelli (born 9 May 1994 in Fasano) is an Italian racing driver that currently competes in the NASCAR Whelen Euro Series for PK Carsport in the Elite 2 division and the smart EQ fortwo e-cup, where he is currently the series' defending champion. Ghirelli won the Auto GP championship in 2013 for Super Nova International. He also previously competed in series such as Italian Formula Three, GP3 Series, and Indy Lights.

Racing record

Complete GP3 Series results
(key) (Races in bold indicate pole position) (Races in italics indicate fastest lap)

Complete Formula Renault 3.5 Series results
(key) (Races in bold indicate pole position) (Races in italics indicate fastest lap)

Complete Auto GP results
(key) (Races in bold indicate pole position) (Races in italics indicate fastest lap)

Complete GP2 Series results
(key) (Races in bold indicate pole position) (Races in italics indicate fastest lap)

Indy Lights

Complete NASCAR results

Whelen Euro Series – EuroNASCAR PRO
(key) (Bold – Pole position. Italics – Fastest lap. * – Most laps led. ^ – Most positions gained)

 Season still in progress.

NASCAR Whelen Euro Series – EuroNASCAR 2

References

External links
 
 

1994 births
Living people
People from Fasano
Italian racing drivers
Italian GP3 Series drivers
Italian Formula Renault 2.0 drivers
Italian Formula Three Championship drivers
Formula Renault Eurocup drivers
Formula Renault 2.0 NEC drivers
World Series Formula V8 3.5 drivers
Formula Renault 2.0 Alps drivers
Auto GP drivers
GP2 Series drivers
Indy Lights drivers
NASCAR drivers
Sportspeople from the Province of Brindisi
Audi Sport drivers
CRS Racing drivers
Jenzer Motorsport drivers
Comtec Racing drivers
Super Nova Racing drivers
Team Lazarus drivers
Team Moore Racing drivers
BVM Target drivers
EuroInternational drivers